Goodenia odonnellii  is a species of flowering plant in the family Goodeniaceae and is endemic to northern Australia. It is an erect to low-lying herb with oblong to egg-shaped leaves with toothed or lyrate edges, and racemes of yellow flowers.

Description

Taxonomy and naming
Goodenia odonnellii was first formally described in 1886 by Ferdinand von Mueller in the Australasian Journal of Pharmacy from specimens collected "near the Ord River by H.T.O'Donell".
The specific epithet (odonnellii) honours H.T. O'Donnell, an "explorer and gold digger".

Distribution and habitat
This goodenia grows on river flats and around sandstone boulders in the north of Western Australia, the northern part of the Northern Territory and the Barkly Tableland in Queensland.

Conservation status
Goodenia odonnellii is classified as "not threatened" by the Government of Western Australia Department of Parks and Wildlife and as of "least concern" under the Northern Territory Government Territory Parks and Wildlife Conservation Act 1976 and the Queensland Government Nature Conservation Act 1992.

References

odonnellii
Eudicots of Western Australia
Flora of the Northern Territory
Flora of Queensland
Plants described in 1886
Taxa named by Ferdinand von Mueller